Black Ruthenia, or Black Rus', is a historical region on the Upper Nemunas, including Novogrudok (Naugardukas), Grodno (Gardinas) and Slonim (Slanimas). Besides these, other important parts of Black Rus' are Vawkavysk (Valkaviskas) and Białystok (Baltstogė). The region was inhabited by the Baltic Yotvingians from ancient times and the name "Black Russia" appeared relatively late.

History
The convention of distinguishing different Ruthenian regions by colours was first done by Medieval Western and Central European historians from the 14th to 17th centuries. Some researchers claim that this color naming convention was influenced by the Mongol invaders, who used them for the cardinal directions.

Sometimes in the 16th century, the names Black, White and Red Ruthenia were given respectively to the Grand Duchy of Moscow, the Grand Duchy of Lithuania, and Lithuanian-owned Ruthenian lands that were given to Poland during the Union of Lublin.

According to Bancks' book from 1813, Black Russia was composed of the Governorates of Kaluga, Moscow, Tula, Ryazan, Vladimir and Yaroslav.

According to Alfred Nicolas Rambaud in the late 19th century:The Lithuanian territories of Grodno, Novogrodek and Belostok were sometimes called Black Russia.

See also 
 Ruthenia
 Red Ruthenia
 White Ruthenia
 Carpathian Ruthenia

References

External links

Historical regions in Belarus
Ruthenians in the Polish–Lithuanian Commonwealth